The East Allen County School (EACS) corporation is an Allen County area public school district, one of the largest in area in Indiana, encompassing southeast Fort Wayne, all of Leo-Cedarville, Monroeville, New Haven, and Woodburn. It operates six secondary schools and eight elementary schools. EACS's current superintendent is Marilyn S. Hissong.

The district was created in the mid-1960s as a combination of 10 smaller, township school districts.

Secondary schools
East Allen University
Heritage Junior/Senior High School
Leo Junior/Senior High School
New Haven High School
Paul Harding Junior High School
Woodlan Junior/Senior High School

New Haven Middle School was its own building until 2019, when grades were reconfigured, with a junior high school attached to New Haven High School.

Elementary schools
Cedarville Elementary
Heritage Elementary 
Leo Elementary
New Haven Intermediate School
New Haven Primary School
Prince Chapman Academy 
Southwick Elementary
Woodlan Elementary

Superintendents of East Allen County Schools

Resources
East Allen County Schools Homepage 
Indiana Department of Education corporation snapshot

References

School districts in Indiana
Education in Allen County, Indiana
1960s establishments in Indiana